Cinemage is a 1999 album by Ryuichi Sakamoto. It is a collection of six of his works for film soundtracks and events, recorded live during a 1998 tour with his orchestra. "El Mar Mediterrani" was composed for the 1992 Barcelona Olympic Games, while David Sylvian sings on the famous "Forbidden Colours", but he recorded the vocal parts in the studio after the live performances.

Track listing
 "Forbidden Colours" – 4:48
 "The Last Emperor" – 5:17
 "Little Buddha" – 8:48
 "Wuthering Heights" – 7:03
 "Replica" – 4:50
 "El Mar Mediterrani" – 17:17

Personnel
Ryuichi Sakamoto – piano, conductor
Yutaka Sado – conductor
David Sylvian – vocals (1)
DJ Spooky – guitar (6)
David Torn – texture (6)

Ryuichi Sakamoto albums
1999 live albums